Maksim Viktorovich Yakubets (Russian: Максим Викторович Якубец) is a Russian computer expert and alleged computer hacker. He is alleged to have been a member of the Evil Corp, Jabber Zeus Crew, as well as the alleged leader of the Bugat malware conspiracy. Russian media openly describe Yakubets as a "hacker who stole $100 million", friend of Dmitry Peskov and discussed his lavish lifestyle, including luxury wedding with a daughter of FSB officer Eduard Bendersky and Lamborghini with "ВОР" (Russian for "thief") registration plate. Yakubets impunity in Russia is perceived as clue of his close ties with FSB, but also criticized by domestic information security experts such as Ilya Sachkov.

Indictments
On November 13, 2019, Yakubets was charged in the United States District Court for the Western District of Pennsylvania for allegedly conspiring in the development, maintenance, distribution, and infection of Bugat malware. The following day, he was charged in the United States District Court for the District of Nebraska for his alleged involvement in the installation of Zeus.

References

Computer criminals
Ukrainian criminals
Russian computer criminals
Living people
1987 births
Hackers
Trojan horses